The 1936 Virginia State Yellow Jackets football team was an American football team that represented Virginia State College as a member of the Colored Intercollegiate Athletic Association (CIAA) during the 1936 college football season. In their third season under head coach Harry R. Jefferson, the team compiled a 9–0–2 record (7–0–2 against CIAA opponents), won the CIAA championship, and outscored opponents by a total of 164 to 46. The team was recognized as the black college national co-champion along with West Virginia State.

Tackle Edward "Wimpy" Taylor was the team captain. Other key players included fullback Rudy Jeter, quarterback Horace Robinson, and halfbacks Ace Bailey and Henry "Red" Briscoe. Taylor and Briscoe were selected as first-team players on the Pittsburgh Courier's 1936 All-America team.

The team's assistant coaches were Thomas V. Verdelle, Roscoe "Turkey" Lewis, and James A. Moore.

Schedule

References

Virginia State
Virginia State Trojans football seasons
Black college football national champions
College football undefeated seasons
Virginia State Trojans football